Vũ Thị Hương (born October 7, 1986, in Định Hóa, Thái Nguyên) is a track and field sprint athlete who competes internationally for Vietnam.

Huong (she is referred to by her first name Huong, as is the custom in Vietnam) won the silver medal in women's 100m event and the bronze medal in women's 200m event at the 2007 Asian Athletics Championship in Amman, Jordan. She also won the bronze medal in women's 100m and silver medal in the women's 200m event at the 16th Asian Games in Guangzhou, China in 2009.

At recent Southeast Asian Games editions, she has been dominating the short distances. She won the double (both 100m and 200m) gold medal at the 2007 Games  in Thailand, and the 100m gold and 200 m silver at the 2005 Games in the Philippines. At the first SEA Games in her career (2003 in Vietnam) she won bronze in the 100m and silver in the 4x100 relay with the Vietnam team.

Huong represented Vietnam at the 2008 Summer Olympics in Beijing. She competed at the 100 metres sprint and placed third in her first round heat after Kim Gevaert and Yulia Nestsiarenka in a time of 11.65 seconds. She qualified for the second round in which she failed to qualify for the semi finals as her time of 11.70 was the eighth and slowest time of her race. At the first elimination round, she beat many strong contestants including Chisato Fukushima of Japan and Halimat Ismaila of Nigeria.

At the 3rd Asian Indoor Games in Hanoi, she dominated in the women's 60 mm and won the gold medal in a time of 7.24 seconds.

References

External links
 

1986 births
Living people
People from Thái Nguyên province
Vietnamese female sprinters
Olympic athletes of Vietnam
Athletes (track and field) at the 2008 Summer Olympics
Asian Games medalists in athletics (track and field)
Athletes (track and field) at the 2006 Asian Games
Athletes (track and field) at the 2010 Asian Games
Athletes (track and field) at the 2014 Asian Games
Asian Games silver medalists for Vietnam
Asian Games bronze medalists for Vietnam
Medalists at the 2010 Asian Games
Southeast Asian Games medalists in athletics
Southeast Asian Games gold medalists for Vietnam
Southeast Asian Games silver medalists for Vietnam
Southeast Asian Games bronze medalists for Vietnam
Competitors at the 2003 Southeast Asian Games
Competitors at the 2005 Southeast Asian Games
Competitors at the 2007 Southeast Asian Games
Competitors at the 2009 Southeast Asian Games
Competitors at the 2013 Southeast Asian Games
21st-century Vietnamese women